Sergio Fernando Díaz Santos (born 29 October 1983) is a Mexican professional boxer.

Professional career
On 17 August 2013, Thompson lost to Takashi Miura in Cancún for the WBC super featherweight title.

Personal life
His birth name is Sergio Díaz Santos but he fights under the surname Thompson, which is his paternal grandmother's maiden name.

References

External links
 

Living people
1983 births
Mexican male boxers
Super-featherweight boxers
Boxers from Quintana Roo
People from Chetumal, Quintana Roo
20th-century Mexican people
21st-century Mexican people